Jorge Adalberto Búcaro (born 1946) is a Salvadoran former football player and manager.

Club career
El Gancho (the Hook) Búcaro started his career in 1966 with Águila and won the 1968 league titla with them. In 1971, he joined Alianza followed by a move to Platense with whom he won another league title in 1975. He retired when playing with FAS in 1976.

International career
Búcaro also played for El Salvador and has represented his country in 2 FIFA World Cup qualification matches in 1968. He also was a squad member of the Selección when they played Honduras in 1969 which sparked the infamous Football War, but he did not make the squad for the 1970 FIFA World Cup.

Managerial career
After retiring, Búcaro managed a crop of lower division sides like Salvadoreño (Armenia), Arcense and El Roble before taking charge of Second Division Santa Tecla.

References

External links
 Jorge Búcaro at playmakerstats.com (English version of ceroacero.es)

1946 births
Living people
Association football midfielders
Salvadoran footballers
El Salvador international footballers
C.D. Águila footballers
Alianza F.C. footballers
C.D. FAS footballers
Salvadoran football managers